Buk Vlaka is a village in Dubrovnik-Neretva County in Croatia.

References 

Populated places in Dubrovnik-Neretva County